The Women's 50 metre breaststroke competition of the swimming events at the 2015 World Aquatics Championships was held on 8 August with the heats and the semifinals and 9 August with the final.

Records
Prior to the competition, the existing world and championship records were as follows.

Results

Heats
The heats were held on 8 August at 10:08.

Semifinals
The semifinals were held on 8 August at 17.56.

Semifinal 1

Semifinal 2

Final
The final was held on 9 August at 17:39.

References

Women's 50 metre breaststroke
2015 in women's swimming